Parthenope may refer to:

 Parthenope (Siren), one of the Sirens in Greek mythology

People
 Parthenope, in Greek mythology, the daughter of Ancaeus.
 Frances Parthenope Verney, Parthenope Nightingale, the elder sister of Florence Nightingale and wife of Sir Harry Verney, named after her place of birth in Naples

Geography
 Parthenope (Naples), an ancient Greek settlement now part of Naples, Italy
 Parthenopaean Republic, a short-lived republic established in Naples during the French Revolution, named for the ancient Greek settlement

Music

 Parthenope, band from New York featuring Jennifer Charles and Doveman

Other uses

 Parthenope (crab), a genus of crabs in the family  Parthenopidae
 Parthenope (fungus), a genus of fungi in the order Helotiales
 11 Parthenope, an asteroid
 Partenopei, nickname of Italian football club S.S.C. Napoli

See also 

 Partenope (disambiguation)